The men's 4 × 100 metres relay at the 2015 World Championships in Athletics was held at the Beijing National Stadium on 29 August.

Summary

Heats
Jamaica ran Rasheed Dwyer to rest Usain Bolt in the heats. The United States employed a rare strategy of running the main team and not resting any runners.

The US won the first heat with Great Britain second while resting Chijindu Ujah. Jamaica won the second heat. China set an Asian Continental Record in their heat.

Final race
The United States managed a clean handoff two times between Trayvon Bromell, Justin Gatlin and Tyson Gay, while Jamaica  stiff between Nesta Carter and Asafa Powell. Around the final turn, Nickel Ashmeade made up ground on Gay. The final baton change between Mike Rodgers and Tyson Gay was completed outside the changeover zone and the American team was disqualified.	

Jamaica won, with China second and Canada third. Britain did not finish after failing to complete the final baton change.

Records
Prior to the competition, the records were as follows:

Qualification standards

Schedule

Results

Heats
Qualification: First 3 of each heat (Q) plus the 2 fastest times (q) advance to the final.

Final
The final was started at 21:10.

References

4 x 100 metres relay
Relays at the World Athletics Championships